The following is a list of video games based on the manga and anime series Fist of the North Star (Hokuto no Ken). Since 1986, many video games based on the franchise have been released for the Japanese market, including coin-operated arcade games and computer software. Some of them have been also released for the North American and European markets, including Black Belt (rebranded from 1986's Hokuto no Ken), Fist of the North Star (1987), Last Battle (rebranded from Shin Seikimatsu Kyūseishu Densetsu: Hokuto no Ken), Fighting Mania, Fist of the North Star (2005), Fist of the North Star: Ken's Rage, Fist of the North Star: Ken's Rage 2, and Fist of the North Star: Lost Paradise.

1980s

1990s

2000s

2010s

2020s

Gekiuchi series

Hisshōhō series

Crossover games

References

External links
 Hokuto no Ken at Sega's Virtual Console site 
 Hokuto no Ken: Shin Sekimatsu Kyuseishu Densetsu at Sega's Virtual Console site 
Official site of the Hokuto no Ken arcade game site at Sega 
Official site of Hokuto no Ken: Seikimatsu Kyuseishu Densetsu at Bandai
 Official site of Sega Ages 2500 Hokuto no Ken at Sega
 Official site of Punch Mania: Hokuto no Ken at Konami 
 Hisshōhō series website 
 Official site of Hokuto no Ken: Hokuto Shinken Denshōsha no Michi at Spike  
 Official site of Ten no Haoh at Interchannel

Fist of the North Star
 
Fist of the North Star video games